Nand Lal (1887–1959) was an Indian freedom fighter.

Nand Lal may also refer to:

Nand Lal (academic), Indian academic
Nand Lal (politician) (?–2019), Indian politician from the state of Punjab
Bhai Nand Lal (1633–1713), Persian and Arabic poet
Nand Lal Meena (born 1936), Indian politician from Baran district, Rajasthan
Nand Lal Meena (born 1946), Indian politician, former cabinet minister in the Government of Rajashtan
Nand Lal Noorpuri (1906–1966), Punjabi poet, writer and lyricist
Nand Lal (Himachal Pradesh politician), Indian politician